Upper River Valley Hospital is a Canadian hospital located in Waterville, New Brunswick.

Operated by Horizon Health Network, the Upper River Valley Hospital opened November 18, 2007, replacing the Carleton Memorial Hospital in Woodstock, NB and the Northern Carleton Hospital in Bath, NB.

The hospital's location was influenced by the nearby construction of a new 4-lane expressway alignment for Route 2. Many residents of Carleton County were upset with the closing of their old hospitals and the relocation of health care services to Waterville.

Services
 Addictions and Mental Health
 Clinical Services
 Day Surgery
 Dialysis (Nephrology)
 Emergency Department
 Family Medicine
 Gastroenterology
 General Surgery
 Geriatrics / Restorative Care
 Intensive Care Unit (ICU)
 Internal Medicine
 Minor Surgery
 Pediatrics
 Palliative Care
 Obstetrics
 Oncology
 Ophthalmology (Eye) Surgery
 Rehabilitation
 Urology Surgery
 Support and Therapy
 Diagnostics and Testing
 Clinics
 Extra Mural Programs
 Public Health Programs
 Other Services

References

External links
River Valley Health - Upper River Valley Hospital

Hospital buildings completed in 2007
Hospitals in New Brunswick
Buildings and structures in Carleton County, New Brunswick
Hospitals established in 2007
2007 establishments in New Brunswick